SULO was an Australian rock band formed in 1999 on the Mid North Coast of New South Wales. The band was influenced by Metal, Nu Metal and Punk.

Early Years (1999–2002) 
Originally, the band had five members, all of whom where from the Kempsey area.

While still in school the band gained released several independent demo EP's.

In 2001 SULO appeared on the 6th volume of the Grow Your Own series released by Foghorn Records. During this time the band underwent several lineup changes as well as touring the east coast of Australia more frequently.

By mid-2002 they relocated to Melbourne with only Jimmy Kyle, Ronojoy Fleissgarten, Arlo Enemark and Gaff remaining. Without a drummer, the band commenced production of their EP Western Glare in Sydney while still maintaining a busy touring schedule, sharing the stage with the likes of Cog, The Butterfly Effect, The Hard-ons and The Sick Puppies.

Western Glare era (2003–2004) 
In 2003, the band re-wrote most of the songs intended for Western Glare. Eventually the EP was recorded at Damien Gerards Sound Studis with Michael Chapman drumming. The completion of Western Glare saw the departure of Arlo Enemark with Melbourne drummer Tim Shearman joining the band permanently.

Upon the completion of the EP and line up the band filmed the video for the song Sorry in Wagga Wagga. Immediately following this a mini tour of the East Coast was announced to close out the year.

Tim Shearman continued playing with numerous Metal and Hardcore bands, most notably The Red Shore, Her Nightmare, Sam Sara.

Jimmy Kyle and Ronojoy Fleissgarten went on to form Art Punk band Killcare Beach which toured briefly over 18 months. Jimmy left to join Screamo/post-Hardcore band Bellevue soon after Ronojoy joined.

Arlo began an electronic project Smile on Impact.

In 2011 Gaff played bass both live and in the studio for Newcastle band The Vocal Lotion's debut EP A & L #1.

References 
1. Rock Against Howard interview on Fasterlouder.com.au

2. SULO in Animal Lberation Celebrity Auction 2001

3. Waterfront Redords review and artist page

4. Foghorn Records Grow Your Own vol. 6 page featuring SULO

5. SULO article in The Macaleay Argus 11 January 2001

6. SULO article in The Macleay Argus 20 February 2001

7. SKA TV 2004 Activist Awards

8. - The Vocal Lotion's website

Australian rock music groups